Georgios Chalkidis (also transliterated Giorgos Khalkidis, born 13 May 1977) is a retired Greek male handball player. He was a member of the Greece men's national handball team, playing as a pivot. He was a part of the  team at the 2004 Summer Olympics and at the 2005 World Championship.

References

External links 
 
 
 

1977 births
Living people
Greek male handball players
Olympic handball players of Greece
Handball players at the 2004 Summer Olympics
Sportspeople from Ptolemaida